LZ 10 Schwaben was a German rigid airship built by Luftschiffbau Zeppelin in 1911 and operated by DELAG (Deutsche Luftschiffahrts-Aktiengesellschaft) for passenger service. It is regarded as the first commercially successful passenger-carrying aircraft.

Design

Schwaben was the first Zeppelin to use these engines, which were used to drive most later examples. The cylindrical hull structure was braced by a triangular keel running most of its length, which was widened amidships to accommodate the passenger cabin, which had a capacity of 20 people. Two gondolas were suspended from the keel; the forward one containing the control  position and one engine, and the aft one containing the remaining two engines. The engines drove two pairs of aluminium-bladed propellers mounted on brackets either side of the hull.

Operating history

The LZ 10 made its first flight on June 26, 1911 and was put into service three weeks later, on July 16, 1911. It was called the "lucky airship" because it was more successful than any of the previous craft that DELAG had put into service, and was the first commercially successful passenger aircraft in history.  Over the course of the next year it made 218 flights, transporting 1,553 passengers. among whom were Crown Prince Wilhelm and his wife. The Prince, who had a pilot's license, travelled in the control car, while the Princess and her attendants occupied the passenger cabin for a flight over Berlin.

Schwaben was destroyed in a gale on June 28, 1912 at the airfield near Düsseldorf,  The wind prevented it being put into its shed, and it broke loose from its moorings and broke its back. The hydrogen was ignited by spark caused by static electricity accumulated in the rubberised cotton gasbags: in moments the entire ship had been burnt. Sources differ regarding injuries suffered: the New York Times reported "34 soldiers were injured"; others claimed either 30 or 40 injured.

Specifications

See also
List of Zeppelins
Post-Luftschiff Schwaben über Offenbach am Main 1912. Commons

Notes

References
Robinson, Douglas H., Giants in the Sky Henley-on Thames: Foulis, 1973 
Dirk Hecht, Zeppeline über Schriesheim. In: Schriesheimer Jahrbuch 2011, 2011, 99–111 (with pictures);
Brooks, Peter W. Zeppelin: Rigid Airships 1893–1940, Washington, D.C.: Smithsonian Institute Press, 1992

External links
 
Evening Post – 9 November 1912 – Page 10, newspaper article with statistics on the Schwaben

Zeppelins
Hydrogen airships
1911 in Germany
Aircraft first flown in 1911